Lythria is a genus of moths in the family Geometridae erected by Jacob Hübner in 1823. It is the only genus of the monotypic tribe Lythriini described by Claude Herbulot in 1962.

Systematics
The genus Lythria consists of five species:
 Tribe Lythriini Herbulot, 1962
 Genus Lythria Hübner, 1823
 Lythria cruentaria (Hufnagel, 1767)
 Lythria plumularia (Freyer, 1831)
 Lythria purpuraria (Linnaeus, 1758)
 Lythria sanguinaria (Duponchel, 1842)
 Lythria venustata Staudinger, 1882

Phylogenics
Within the Sterrhinae, the Lythriini are probably the sister group of the Rhodometrini, as diagrammed by the cladogram below:

References

External links
 "Fotoübersicht Sterrhinae". Lepiforum e.V. 
 "Lythria sanguinaria (Duponchel, 1842)". Moths and Butterflies of Europe and North Africa.

 Kimber, Ian "There were 119 matches for the search term 'Sterrhinae'". UKMoths. Retrieved from the original. September 20, 2012.
 Fauna Europaea, with Lythriini listed as a belonging to the subfamily Larentiinae